Mexico–Ukraine relations are the bilateral relations between Mexico and Ukraine. Both nations are members of the United Nations.

History
The first Ukrainians to arrive to Mexico came from the Austro-Hungarian Empire and settled in the Mexican State of Campeche. On 25 December 1991, Mexico recognized Ukraine as an independent nation after the dissolution of the Soviet Union. On 12 January 1992, Mexico officially established diplomatic relations with Ukraine.

In 1997, Ukrainian president Leonid Kuchma paid an official visit to Mexico, which helped increase bilateral relations between the two nations. In January 1999, Ukraine opened its embassy in Mexico City while Mexico opened an honorary consulate in Kyiv in 2000 while maintaining official relations with Ukraine from its embassy in Warsaw, Poland. In June 2005, Mexican president Vicente Fox paid an official state visit to the country and attended the opening of the Mexican embassy in Kyiv along with Ukrainian President Viktor Yushchenko. In February 2008, the Congress of Mexico recognized that The Holodomor was an act of genocide and criminal act committed against the Ukrainian people by the Soviet Union.

In 2014, during the Crimean crisis between Ukraine and Russia; Mexico called for both sides seek dialogue and a peaceful resolution to the matter. The Mexican government also supported the request of the United Nations for the international community to "respect the unity and territorial integrity of Ukraine" and Mexico voted in favor of UN Resolution 68/262 recognizing Crimea as part of Ukraine. In January 2017, both nations celebrated 25 years of diplomatic relations.

During the 2022 Russian invasion of Ukraine, Mexico condemned Russia's action and requested the respect for Ukraine's territorial integrity. Mexico also condemned Russia's action at the United Nations Security Council as a non-Permanent Member.

High-level visits
Presidential visits from Mexico to Ukraine
 President Vicente Fox (2005)

Presidential visits from Ukraine to Mexico
 President Leonid Kuchma (1997)

Agreements
Both nations have signed several bilateral agreements, such as an Agreement of Mutual Interests (1997); Agreement on the elimination of Visa Requirements for Diplomatic Passport holders (1997); Agreement on Scientific and Technological Cooperation (1997); Agreement on Educational and Cultural Cooperation (1997); Agreement on Trade and Economic Cooperation (2003); Agreement of Cooperation between the National Aerospace University – Kharkiv Aviation Institute of Ukraine and the Instituto Politécnico Nacional of Mexico (2005); Agreement on the Avoidance of Double-Taxation and Tax Evasion (2011) and an Agreement of Cooperation between the Agencia Espacial Mexicana and the State Space Agency of Ukraine (2017).

Trade
In 2018, two-way trade between both nations amounted to US$253 million. Mexico's main exports to Ukraine include: automobiles, motor boats, three-wheel motorcycles, electrical circuits and machinery, nuclear reactors, instant coffee, tequila and beer. Ukraine's main exports to Mexico include: steel machinery, automobile parts, wheat and flour. Mexican multinational companies Gruma and Grupo Bimbo operate in Ukraine.

Resident diplomatic missions
 Mexico has an embassy in Kyiv.
 Ukraine has an embassy in Mexico City.

See also
 Foreign relations of Mexico
 Foreign relations of Ukraine 
 Ukrainians in Mexico

References

 
Ukraine
Bilateral relations of Ukraine